HMS Clarence was an 84-gun second rate ship of the line of the Royal Navy, launched on 25 July 1827 at Pembroke Dockyard. The second navy ship to bear the name, she was ordered as HMS Goliath but renamed in 1826 prior to completion.

In 1872 she was lent to the Liverpool Catholic Reformatory Association for use as a boys reformatory ship, but was destroyed by a fire set by six of the boys whilst at her mooring in the Mersey in 1884. 

Liverpool Catholic Reformatory Association was lent a replacement in 1885 called , a 120 gun first-rate ship reduced to a 72-gun screw ship in 1860. Renamed Clarence, she was ultimately also destroyed in the Mersey by arson on 26 July 1899.

Notes

References

Lavery, Brian (2003) The Ship of the Line - Volume 1: The development of the battlefleet 1650–1850. Conway Maritime Press. .

Ships of the line of the Royal Navy
Canopus-class ships of the line
Ships built in Pembroke Dock
1827 ships
Maritime incidents in January 1884